Torkaman may refer to:

Bandar Torkaman, a city in Iran
Torkaman County, an administrative subdivision of Golestan Province, Iran
Torkamanchay, a city in East Azerbaijan Province, Iran
Torkaman, West Azerbaijan, a village in West Azerbaijan Province, Iran
Torkaman, alternate name of Uzan Torkaman, a village in West Azerbaijan Province, Iran
Torkaman Rural District, in West Azerbaijan Province, Iran
Torkaman, alternate name of Hameh Sin, Tehran Province, Iran
Torkaman (film), a 1974 Iranian film

See also
Turkmen (disambiguation)